Nantmeal Village is an unincorporated community in Chester County, in the U.S. state of Pennsylvania.

History
A post office called Nantmeal Village was established in 1876, and remained in operation until 1918. The community took its name from Nantmeal Township.

References

Unincorporated communities in Chester County, Pennsylvania
Unincorporated communities in Pennsylvania